Renhe is a town under the administration of Zitong County, Sichuan, China. , it administers Tianbaochang Residential Community and the following 12 villages:
Tianle Village
Guanlong Village
Mengya Village
Xinhua Village
Songlin Village
Tiantai Village
Shuguang Village
Qiushu Village
Liren Village
Lianghe Village
Daxin Village
Qingyuan Village

In 2019, Renhe absorbed the administrative area of Daxin which was abolished.

References 

Township-level divisions of Sichuan
Zitong County